Hill House School is a preparatory day school in London, England.

Hill House School may also refer to:

 Hill House School, a school in Hampshire, England, see List of schools in Hampshire#Special and alternative schools
 Hill House School, South Yorkshire, England
 Hill House Kindergarten, Amman, Jordan
 Hillhouse High School, Connecticut, United States

See also
 The Hill School (disambiguation)
 Hill House (disambiguation)